Emily Woo Zeller is an American voice actress and audio book narrator. She voices Panam Palmer in CD Projekt Red's 2020 videogame Cyberpunk 2077. In the Star Wars canon, she is Dr. Aphra in the audio drama Dr. Aphra and narrated in the 2020 audio production of FROM A CERTAIN POINT OF VIEW: THE EMPIRE STRIKES BACK.

Personal life
Zeller attended UC Berkeley majoring in dance, theater, and performance studies. In her fifth year, she was awarded one of the school's Eisner Awards for creative talent in 2006. After school, she spent some time living on Lamma Island in Hong Kong.

Awards and honors
In 2020, AudioFile Magazine selected Zeller as a Golden Voice narrator.

Awards

"Best of" lists

Filmography

References

External links

Living people
Audiobook narrators
American voice actresses
Year of birth missing (living people)